Henry Fynes Clinton (14 January 1781 – 24 October 1852) was an English classical scholar, chronologist and Member of Parliament.

Life
He was born in Gamston, Nottinghamshire, the eldest son of Rev. Charles Fynes, prebendary of Westminster and perpetual curate of St. Margaret's, Westminster. For some generations his family bore the name of Fynes, but his father resumed the older family name of Clinton in 1821. His brother was the barrister and MP Clinton James Fynes Clinton.

Henry was educated at Southwell Grammar School, Westminster School and Christ Church, Oxford, where he studied classical literature and history. He entered Lincoln's Inn in 1808 to study law.

From 1806 to 1826 he was Member of Parliament (MP) for Aldborough.

He died at Welwyn, Herts, where he had purchased the residence and estate of the poet Edward Young. He had married twice; firstly Harriott, the daughter of Rev. Charles Wylde of Nottingham
and secondly Katherine, the daughter of Rt. Rev. Henry William Majendie, Bishop of Bangor. They had 2 sons who predeceased their father and 9 daughters.

Works
His reading was methodical (see his Literary Remains). His Fasti, on classical chronology, has required correction on the basis of later research.

His major works are:

 Fasti Hellenici, the Civil and Literary Chronology of Greece from the 55th to the 124th Olympiad (1824–1851), including dissertations on points of Greek history and Scriptural chronology; and
 Fasti Romani, the Civil and Literary Chronology of Rome and Constantinople from the Death of Augustus to the Death of Heraclius (1845–1850).

In 1851 and 1853 respectively he published epitomes of the above. The Literary Remains of H. F. Clinton (the first part of which contains an autobiography written in 1818) were edited by Clinton James Fynes Clinton in 1854.

References

Attribution

1781 births
1852 deaths
People from Bassetlaw District
People educated at Southwell Minster Collegiate Grammar School
People educated at Westminster School, London
Alumni of Christ Church, Oxford
Members of Lincoln's Inn
Chronologists
Members of the Parliament of the United Kingdom for English constituencies
UK MPs 1806–1807
UK MPs 1807–1812
UK MPs 1812–1818
UK MPs 1818–1820
UK MPs 1820–1826